The 36th Homeland Defense Infantry Division (Hanja: 第三十六鄕土步兵師團) is a military formation of the Republic of Korea Army. The division is subordinated to the Ground Operations Command and headquartered in Wonju, Gangwon Province. During peacetime, they are in charge of defense central and southern Gangwon Province. They also are responsible for recruit training and flood control.

History 
The division was created in Inje County, Gangwon Province on 20 April 1955, shortly after Korean War and moved to current garrison in 1982.

Organization 

Headquarters:
Reconnaissance Battalion
Engineer Battalion
Mobile Battalion
Artillery Battalion
Signal Battalion
Support Battalion
Military Police Battalion
Medical Battalion
Chemical Battalion
Intelligence Company	
Air Defense Company
Headquarters Company
107th Infantry Brigade
108th Infantry Brigade
109th Infantry Brigade

References 

InfDiv0036SK
Military units and formations established in 1955
Wonju